Terance Gerald "Terry" Roberts (28 January 1946 – 18 February 2006) was a member of the South Australian Legislative Council between 1985 and 2006. At the time of his death, he was a Minister for Aboriginal Affairs and Reconciliation and Correctional Services in the South Australian government.

Roberts was born and educated in Millicent, South Australia. After leaving school, he worked for several years as a ship's engineer and watchkeeper. He also had a brief stint working in parole and pre-release centre while working in London for a year. Roberts later worked as an official for the Construction, Forestry, Mining and Energy Union (CFMEU)  and was a member of the Australian Labor Party for most of his life.

He was elected to the Legislative Council in 1985 and served as a backbencher until 1993. After Labor went into Opposition, he was appointed as a Shadow Minister for Aboriginal Affairs and Correctional Services.

Roberts was appointed to the Cabinet after the election of the Rann Government. As the Minister for Aboriginal Affairs, he added more sacred sites to the Aboriginal Heritage Register than any other minister.

He was diagnosed as having pancreatic cancer in 2005 while surgery was being done on a bile duct obstruction. Roberts extended sick leave to undertake chemotherapy and radiation therapy before returning to work. While he returned to work in the middle of 2005, he died during February 2006.

The vacancy created in the upper house was filled in May 2006 by Bernard Finnigan.

References

 ABC Online "Tribute flow following SA Minister's death" 19 February 2006.
 Ninemsn, "Tributes flow following death of SA MP" 19 February 2006.

1946 births
2006 deaths
Members of the South Australian Legislative Council
Australian Labor Party members of the Parliament of South Australia
People from Millicent, South Australia
20th-century Australian politicians
21st-century Australian politicians